Bolatice is a municipality and village in Opava District in the Moravian-Silesian Region of the Czech Republic. It has about 4,400 inhabitants. It is part of the historic Hlučín Region.

Administrative parts
The village of Borová (until 1949 Heneberky) is an administrative part of Bolatice.

History
The first written mention of Bolatice is in a letter of Pope Innocent IV from 1250. From 1742 the village belonged to Prussia after Maria Theresa had been defeated. The Prussian state sold Bolatice to Henn of Henneberg brothers in 1784. The new owners founded a new hamlet called Heneberky nearby in 1786. Heneberky was joined to Bolatice in 1893 and renamed Borová in 1949.

Notable people
Adolf Theuer (1920–1947), SS officer at Auschwitz concentration camp executed for war crimes

Twin towns — sister cities

Bolatice is twinned with:
 Doľany, Slovakia
 Linum (Fehrbellin), Germany
 Nagykovácsi, Hungary
 Rudy (Kuźnia Raciborska), Poland

Bolatice also has friendly relations with Slaný in the Czech Republic.

References

External links

Villages in Opava District
Hlučín Region